Mo'allem Freeway, also numbered as Freeway 9 is a freeway in central Iran located in Isfahan Province. The road is an alternative option for Azadegan Expressway connecting Isfahan to Shahinshahr.

Route

Future extension
There are plans awaiting investment to extend the freeway Northwards to replace The existing expressway to Delijan and Salafchegan.

References

Freeways in Iran
Transport in Isfahan
Transportation in Isfahan Province